Hon. Ralph Edward Gathorne-Hardy (4 June 190118 June 1978) was a British antiquarian, traveler and socialite.

Early life 
The second child of Gathorne Gathorne-Hardy, 3rd Earl of Cranbrook - grandson of Gathorne Gathorne-Hardy, 1st Earl of Cranbrook, by his wife Lady Dorothy Boyle, the daughter of David Boyle, 7th Earl of Glasgow, he was educated at Eton and Christ Church, Oxford.

One of the group designated by the press the 'Bright Young People' in the 1920s, he shared a flat with Brian Howard at 39 Maddox Street in London, which was so run-down that fungus grew on the dilapidated staircase.

Career 
Gathorne-Hardy began a career in antiques, culture, history and art dealing. Although he was respected in antiques, specialising in 18th-century literature, and worked as a director and rare book expert for the booksellers Elkin Mathews alongside his brother Robert, he remained impecunious, largely living off his elder brother, John David Gathorne-Hardy, 4th Earl of Cranbrook. He also worked at various colleges and for the British Council.

After 1935, he lived in Athens, Cairo and Lebanon, returning to England in the late 1960s in poor health. He died aged 77 on 18 June 1978.

Gathorne-Hardy's sister, Anne (1911–2006), was the wife of George Heywood Hill, owner of the Mayfair bookshop bearing his name. A nephew- son of his younger brother Anthony- was Jonathan Gathorne-Hardy.

References

External links
Article on the Bright Young People by D. J. Taylor
Biographical details and anecdotes
Biographical details and anecdotes and unpublished obituary by Patrick Leigh-Fermor

1901 births
1978 deaths
20th-century antiquarians
Alumni of Christ Church, Oxford
British socialites
People educated at Eton College
Younger sons of earls